Sacagawea's Nickname: Essays on the American West, is a collection of essays by the American writer Larry McMurtry. It was published in 2001 by New York Review Books, and consists chiefly of articles, book reviews and also some interesting tidbits about the young woman that had appeared in the publishing house's affiliated magazine The New York Review of Books between 1997 and 2001. The book was generally well received by reviewers.

McMurtry dedicated the book to Barbara Epstein, editor of the NYRB.

Contents
 The West Without Chili
 Inventing the West
 Chopping Down the Sacred Tree
 A Heroine of the Prairies
 Zuni 
 Cookie Pioneers
 Powell of the Colorado
 Pulpmaster
 Janet Lewis
 The American Epic
 Sacagawea's Nickname
 Old Misery

2001 non-fiction books
American essay collections
Books by Larry McMurtry
History books about the American Old West
Sacagawea
Books of literary criticism